{{Infobox concert
|concert_tour_name = OMG Tour
|image             = Usher Vegas OMG Tour poster.jpg
|image_size        = 220px
|image_caption     = Promotional poster for the tour
|album             = Raymond v. Raymond, Versus
|artist            = Usher
|start_date  	   = 
|end_date          = 
|number_of_legs    = 4
|number_of_shows   = 92
|last_tour         = One Night Stand: Ladies Only(2008)
|this_tour         = OMG Tour(2010–11)
|next_tour         = UR Experience Tour(2014–15)
}}

OMG Tour was the fourth concert tour by American recording artist Usher. Visiting North America, Asia, Europe and Australia, the tour accompanies his sixth studio album, Raymond v. Raymond (2010), as well as his first extended play, Versus (2010). At the conclusion of 2011, the tour placed seventh on Billboard's annual, "Top 25 Tours", earning nearly $75 million with 73 shows.

Background
In the summer of 2010, Usher competed in a dance battle against fellow R&B artist Chris Brown at the Reggae Sumfest. The battle sparked an Internet rumor of the two possibly going on tour. This was further pushed by producer Jermaine Dupri alluding that the two artist may be unaware of this upcoming tour. The singers later took to Twitter to ask who the fans would like to see them perform with. On September 8, 2010, the singer announced his touring trek (and revealed it was solo) for North America. Due to demand, many additional stops in Europe and Australia were added. It is Usher's first arena tour since The Truth Tour in 2004. To introduce the tour, Usher stated, "Live performance has always been my thing. It's my purpose to master and capture the moment every time I have you connected. For me, I wanted to make sure that it was state of the art. I wanted to make sure that, in comparison to the other shows that are going on around the world, you get the type of experience that leave you saying, 'OMG.' [...] The look of the tour, it's a little futuristic but enough to capture your attention and leave you saying, 'OMG.' That's the whole point. With an incredible record, I wanted to also leave a great impression.

Concert synopsis
The show began with Usher walking onstage amidst red smoke and fireworks, wearing a helmet-like headpiece, and performed "Monstar", "She Don't Know" and "Yeah!". During "Caught Up" he sang into a gold gun-shaped microphone, with which he did tricks. The performance of "More" included break dancing choreography. While Usher sang "OMG", fireworks were let off and blue and white confetti rained.

Critical receptionThe Dallas Morning News Mario Tarradell enjoyed the show, writing that "splash and flash are[Usher's] key ingredients." Jim Harrington of San Jose Mercury News commended Usher's dancing ability, but criticized the show for over-using "distracting" theatrical effects, saying that "the best parts of the big-budget 'OMG' show came when the bells and whistles stopped and the fans were allowed to concentrate all their attention on Usher".

 Broadcast and recordings 
The DVD of the OMG Tour was filmed on February 21, 2011, at The O2 Arena in London, directed by Dick Carruthers. The DVD was released as OMG Tour: Live From London'' on October 31, 2011.

Set list

 "Monstar"
 "She Don't Know"
 "Yeah!"
 "U Remind Me"
 "U Don't Have to Call"
 Michael Jackson Tribute Medley: "Don't Stop 'Til You Get Enough"/ "Rock with You"/ "Billie Jean"
 "You Make Me Wanna"
 "Mars vs. Venus"
 "Nice & Slow"
 "Love 'Em All"
 "Trading Places"
 "Love in This Club"
 "Lil Freak"
 "Hot Tottie"
 "There Goes My Baby"
 "Burn"
 "Bad Girl"
 "Hey Daddy (Daddy's Home)"
 Medley: "Confessions Part II" / "My Boo" / "I Need a Girl (Part One)" / "Lovers and Friends"
 "Caught Up"
 "DJ Got Us Fallin' in Love"
 "More"
Encore
"OMG"

Source:

Tour dates

Cancellations and rescheduled shows

Personnel
 Director – Barry Lather
 Choreography – Anwar "Flii Stylz" Burton, Aakomon "AJ" Jones, Todd Sams and David "SuperDave" Royster 
 Musical Direction – Johnny "Natural" Najera, Josh Thomas and Usher Raymond IV 
 Art/Creative – Barry Lather, Josh Thomas, Anwar "Flii Stylz" Burton, Usher Raymond IV and Aakomon "AJ" Jones
 Dancers – Devin Jamieson, Marc "Marvelous" Inniss, Saidah Nairobi, Eyal Layani, Eddie Morales, Ed Moore and Todd Sams

Source:

Notes

References

Usher (musician) concert tours
2010 concert tours
2011 concert tours